Paul Gerard Shanahan (18 October 1948 – 15 February 2011) was an Australian rules footballer who played with Fitzroy in the Victorian Football League (VFL).

Shanahan, a Northcote recruit, played 21 games for Fitzroy, with 12 of his appearances coming in the 1970 VFL season. He left Fitzroy after the 1972 season and played with West Perth, followed by a stint in South Australia playing for West Torrens.

He was also a bowler for the Northcote Cricket Club in district cricket; and, at the age of 17, he played in Northcote's 1st XI premiership winning side in 1965–66, which was captained by Test opener Bill Lawry.

See also
 The 1965–66 Victorian District Cricket final

References

1948 births
Australian rules footballers from Victoria (Australia)
Fitzroy Football Club players
Northcote Football Club players
West Perth Football Club players
West Torrens Football Club players
2011 deaths